Pitchouna Tezi Lelo (born 31 December 1987), known as Pitshou Tezi, is a DR Congolese footballer who plays as a defender. She has been a member of the DR Congo women's national team.

Club career
Tezi has played for La Source Brazzaville in the Republic of the Congo and for Grand Hotel in the Democratic Republic of the Congo.

International career
Tezi capped for the DR Congo at senior level during the 2006 African Women's Championship. She also attended the 2012 edition.

See also
 List of Democratic Republic of the Congo women's international footballers

References

External links

1987 births
Living people
Footballers from Kinshasa
Democratic Republic of the Congo women's footballers
Women's association football defenders
Democratic Republic of the Congo women's international footballers
Democratic Republic of the Congo expatriate footballers
Democratic Republic of the Congo expatriate sportspeople in the Republic of the Congo
Expatriate footballers in the Republic of the Congo